Selibice is one of the smallest villages in the Czech Republic. It is located in agricultural area of North Bohemia, between Žatec and Postoloprty. The village is located on the way from Tvrsice to Dolejsi Hurky. It is 1.2 km far away from Tvrsice and almost one kilometer from Dolejsi Hurky.

The village is about 3 km the river Ohre.

History 

Archeological excavations prove that the village was inhabited in the Stone Age.

First written mention of the village is from 1352. From that time in the village there was no big population boom.

Most inhabitants live there in 19th century - around 300. According to later records from 1929 there lived around 270 inhabitants (219 Germans and 51 Czechs).

The main building was until the end of the World War II estate. The total count of houses was 48. Not far away from the village there was a sheep-fold.

After World War II, the Germans were evicted and few new inhabitants from the other end of former Czechoslovakia moved in. The estate was without the former owner deteriorating and finally demolished.

Now, in the beginning of the 21st century, Selibice is a part of Staňkovice.

Villages in Louny District